In Greek mythology, Callirhoe (or Kallirhoe, Callirrhoe ) (Ancient Greek: Καλλιρό, Καλλιρρόη, or Καλλιρρόης means 'beautiful flow' or beautiful stream') was one of the Oceanids, daughters of Titans Oceanus and Tethys.

Family 
Callirhoe had consorted with Chrysaor, Neilus, Poseidon and Manes. By Chrysaor, she became the mother of the monsters Geryon and Echidna while Chione was her daughter by the river-god of Egypt, Neilus. Meanwhile, to Poseidon, Callirhoe bore Minyas, founder of Minyan Orchomenus, and to Manes, Cotys, a king of Maeonia.

Mythology 
Callirhoe was the naiad who became the companion of Persephone when the daughter of Demeter was abducted by the lord of the dead, Hades. She was one of the three ancestors of the Tyrians, along with Abarbarea and Drosera.

Legacy 
Jupiter's moon Callirrhoe is named after her.

Notes

References 

 Aken, Dr. A.R.A. van. (1961). Elseviers Mythologische Encyclopedie. Amsterdam: Elsevier.
 Apollodorus, The Library with an English Translation by Sir James George Frazer, F.B.A., F.R.S. in 2 Volumes, Cambridge, MA, Harvard University Press; London, William Heinemann Ltd. 1921. . Online version at the Perseus Digital Library. Greek text available from the same website.
Bartelink, Dr. G.J.M. (1988). Prisma van de mythologie. Utrecht: Het Spectrum.
Dionysus of Halicarnassus, Roman Antiquities. English translation by Earnest Cary in the Loeb Classical Library, 7 volumes. Harvard University Press, 1937-1950. Online version at Bill Thayer's Web Site
 Dionysius of Halicarnassus, Antiquitatum Romanarum quae supersunt, Vol I-IV. . Karl Jacoby. In Aedibus B.G. Teubneri. Leipzig. 1885. Greek text available at the Perseus Digital Library.
 Gaius Julius Hyginus, Fabulae from The Myths of Hyginus translated and edited by Mary Grant. University of Kansas Publications in Humanistic Studies. Online version at the Topos Text Project.
 Hesiod, Theogony from The Homeric Hymns and Homerica with an English Translation by Hugh G. Evelyn-White, Cambridge, MA.,Harvard University Press; London, William Heinemann Ltd. 1914. Online version at the Perseus Digital Library. Greek text available from the same website.
 The Homeric Hymns and Homerica with an English Translation by Hugh G. Evelyn-White. Homeric Hymns. Cambridge, MA.,Harvard University Press; London, William Heinemann Ltd. 1914. Online version at the Perseus Digital Library. Greek text available from the same website.
Kerényi, Carl, The Gods of the Greeks, Thames and Hudson, London, 1951.
Nonnus of Panopolis, Dionysiaca translated by William Henry Denham Rouse (1863-1950), from the Loeb Classical Library, Cambridge, MA, Harvard University Press, 1940.  Online version at the Topos Text Project.
 Nonnus of Panopolis, Dionysiaca. 3 Vols. W.H.D. Rouse. Cambridge, MA., Harvard University Press; London, William Heinemann, Ltd. 1940-1942. Greek text available at the Perseus Digital Library.

Oceanids
Naiads
Rape of Persephone